The Lithuanian Activist Front or LAF was a short-lived, far-right underground resistance organization established in 1940 after Lithuania was incorporated by the Soviet Union. The goal of the organization was to liberate Lithuania and re-establish its independence. It planned and executed the June Uprising and established the short-lived Provisional Government of Lithuania. The Government self-disbanded and LAF was banned by Nazi authorities in September 1941. LAF remains controversial due to its anti-Semitic and anti-Polish positions.

Under the USSR 

LAF was established on 17 November 1940. Kazys Škirpa, former Lithuanian military attaché to Germany, is often credited as the founder. LAF was meant to unite people of various political beliefs, who wanted to see Lithuania as an independent country, rather than as part of the Soviet Union or Nazi Germany. The Berlin unit, formed by Škirpa, united mainly former Lithuanian expatriates and diplomats in Germany. It gathered representatives of most major pre-war Lithuanian factions and parties, and within LAF, the most influential were the Nationalist Unionists and the Christian Democrats. 

As time passed, local LAF units were formed in various Lithuanian cities. The local LAF units were organizing espionage networks. The local LAF units in Lithuanian cities maintained more liberal political views than the Berlin headquarters. Lack of correspondence between the Berlin unit and Lithuanian units prevented discussions of ideology. In Germany, LAF had contact with Wilhelm Franz Canaris and Abwehr, but not the Nazi party. LAF expected that Nazi Germany would attack the Soviet Union and planned to use this occasion for their own rebellion and establishment of independent Lithuania.

On 22 April 1941, representatives of Vilnius and Kaunas branches of LAF decided on a list of members in the planned Provisional Government of Lithuania. The Provisional Government was mainly formed out of Vilnius and Kaunas sections of LAF. However, two of its members, including the prime minister Kazys Škirpa, were in Germany and were later detained there. Over time, many people from this government, as well as other LAF members, were arrested, executed, or exiled by Soviet authorities.

June Uprising 

Germany declared war on the Soviet Union on June 22, 1941, and the same day LAF started the June Uprising. LAF partisans aided the Germans. The next day, June 23, independence of Lithuania was declared. In whole Lithuania about 10,000 people participated in June Uprising, 700 of them were killed by retreating Soviet army. LAF freed 3,336 political prisoners, detained by the Soviets. Short-handed Provisional Government took power on June 24. On June 21 four members of the government were arrested by the Soviet authorities, supposed prime minister Kazys Škirpa was put under house arrest in Berlin, and another minister was also unable to come. Juozas Ambrazevičius became the prime minister.

In Vilnius, LAF (commanded by Vytautas Bulvičius) had been dismantled by Soviet arrests just before the war and Lithuanians formed only a small minority of the city's population. Therefore, the uprising was smaller in scale and started on June 23. The rebels took over the post office, radio station, and other institutions, and hoisted the Lithuanian flag over the Gediminas' Tower. It was relatively easy to take control of Vilnius as most units of the Red Army were located outside the city and retreated rather quickly.

However, the negotiations with Germany over the recognition of Lithuania failed, as Nazi government had no interest in an independent Lithuania. General feldmarschall Walther von Brauchitsch issued a directive on June 26, 1941 to the commander of Army Group North, under which "small armed Lithuanian groups and Lithuanian police" should be disarmed and sent to the concentration camps. Disarmament of LAF activists started by Wehrmacht in Kaunas on June 26 and lasted till June 28. Last LAF activists were disarmed in Zarasai and Obeliai on June 28-29. The German authorities did not use brutal force against its members. Rather, they established their own administrative structures (Reichskommissariat Ostland) and slowly deprived the government of its powers. The government lost all of its power in a few weeks, and seeing no more reason to continue work, dissolved itself on August 5, 1941. LAF as an organization remained. On September 15, it sent a memorandum About the status of Lithuania after the German Civil Administration started to operate (Apie Lietuvos būklę, vokiečių civilinei administracijai pradėjus veikti) to Germany protesting against the occupation of Lithuania and expressing hopes that Germany would not extend its territory at the expense of Lithuania. In response, the Lithuanian Activist Front was banned on September 26; its property confiscated, and its leader Leonas Prapuolenis was arrested and sent to Dachau concentration camp. Other members like Pilypas Narutis-Žukauskas, Petras Paulaitis joined anti-Nazi resistance.

Controversy

The LAF is a controversial organization because of its anti-Semitic and anti-Polish views and overall collaboration with the Nazi Germany. For example, LAF's manifesto-type essay "What Are the Activists Fighting for?" states: "The Lithuanian Activist Front, by restoring the new Lithuania, is determined to carry out an immediate and fundamental purging of the Lithuanian nation and its land of Jews...". The LAF's pro-Nazi rhetoric and stridently anti-Semitic propaganda that equated Jews with Bolshevism and was widely disseminated in Lithuania prior to and during the June uprising likely encouraged the local population to engage in mass violence against Jews that began prior to the arrival of Nazi forces in the country and continued during the Nazi occupation (1941-1945).

By some calculations, more than 95% of Lithuania's Jewish population was massacred during the Nazi occupation—a more complete destruction than befell any other country affected by the Holocaust. Historians attribute this to the massive collaboration in the genocide by the non-Jewish local paramilitaries, though the reasons for this collaboration are still debated. The Holocaust resulted in the largest-ever loss of life in so short a period of time in the history of Lithuania.

The goal of the June uprising organized by the LAF was to seize control of Lithuania as Soviet forces retreated in the face of Germany's attack. During the June uprising, LAF paramilitaries committed many atrocities (rapes, murders, pillage). According to Tadeusz Piotrowski, the Germans referred to these "allies" as "organized robbers". At the beginning of the occupation, Acting Prime Minister of the Provisional Government of Lithuania Juozas Ambrazevičius (a.k.a., Juozas Brazaitis) convened a meeting in which cabinet ministers participated together with former President Kazys Grinius, Bishop Vincentas Brizgys and others, during which Ministers expressed distress at the atrocities being committed against the Jews and decided to help them, however the help could have been very limited as at the very beginning of the Nazi occupation, it was announced that Jews and Poles affairs were excluded from the competence of Lithuanian institutions and that competence was taken over by the Germans and German military commanders. On the other hand, a number of acts issued by the LAF-instituted Provisional Government of Lithuania discriminated against Jews, one notable example being Žydų padėties nuostatai (English: Regulation on the Status of Jews), which according to some authors were never actually adopted and only considered by the Provisional Government. The document Žydų padėties nuostatai was widely used by the Soviet propaganda, however there are physical signs that this document initially was not kept with other documents of the Provisional Government and that it was pulled into a set of rulings by the German-appointed counselors as if it was Provisional Government's ruling when the Provisional Government was already withdrew. In addition, the document Žydų padėties nuostatai was not published anywhere at the time and the affairs of Lithuanian Jews were never governed according to it.

Among the initial tactics of Nazi authorities was to surreptitiously encourage and involve the local population in attacks on Jews. These tactics are well disclosed in the Schutzstaffel General Brigadeführer and Security Police Chief of the Occupied Eastern Territories Franz Walter Stahlecker October 15, 1941 report to the Reich Minister Heinrich Himmler. In this report Stahlecker states that the extermination of Jews in the Wehrmacht-occupied territories should be performed in a way that the Nazis would remain "clean" and that there would be no sign of Nazis actual inspiration, organization or conducting, and it should look like that the local population and its institutions in their own initiative performed the execution of the Jewish population. In this regard, the LAF and its paramilitaries initially proved handy. But later Stahlecker complained that it was "not a simple matter" to organize Lithuanians into actions against Jews.

Lithuanian Minister of National Defence General Stasys Raštikis (former Commander of the Lithuanian Army) met personally with the Nazi Germany Generals to discuss anti-Jewish violence and began narrating about the Lithuanian society and Government dissatisfaction and concern about the persecution and extermination of the Lithuanian Jews started by the Germans and demanded that the campaign against Jews in Kaunas and in the province now be stopped, but the Nazi generals refused and one of them even unexpectedly poured cold water on Raštikis' head when he was leaving.

Meanwhile, the LAF-established Provisional Government of Lithuania did little to oppose the anti-Jewish violence and murder carried out by the Nazis and their local collaborators. Its main goal was to protect ethnic Lithuanians and reestablish an independent Lithuania under the patronage of Nazi Germany. Ministers expressed distress at the atrocities being committed against the Jews, but advised only that "despite all the measures which must be taken against the Jews for their Communist activity and harm done to the German Army, partisans and individuals should avoid public executions of Jews." It is known that the Provisional Government attempted to stop Algirdas Klimaitis and later condemned him for his actions during the Kaunas pogrom. Klimaitis and his gang members did not belonged to LAF, which organized the June Uprising, as he and his gang members were imprisoned in a Bolsheviks' prison and left it only during the first days of the war. According to Lithuanian-American Holocaust historian Saulius Sužiedėlis, "none of this amounted to a public scolding which alone could have persuaded at least some of the Lithuanians who had volunteered or been co-opted into participating in the killings to rethink their behavior."

The Lithuanian TDA Battalions, military units of the Provisional Government, were soon taken over by Nazi officials and reorganized into the Lithuanian Auxiliary Police Battalions (Lithuanian version of Schutzmannschaft). The original TDA eventually became the 12th and the 13th Police Battalions. These two units took an active role in mass killings of the Jews in Lithuania and Belarus. Based on the Jäger Report, members of TDA murdered about 26,000 Jews between July and December 1941.

Later Juozas Ambrazevičius actively participated in the anti-Nazi underground, four members of the Provisional Government were imprisoned in the Nazi concentration camps. There are allegations by certain journalists that, in 1973, a Committee of the United States Congress made conclusions that Prime Minister of the Provisional Government Juozas Ambrazevičius' and Jonas Šlepetys' were not responsible for the Holocaust in Lithuania. However, according to a subsequent clarification issued in 2019 by the Foreign Affairs Committee of the US Congress, the investigation was not conclusive and did not amount to a "rehabilitation" of Ambrazevičius/Brazaitis. The investigation into his wartime activities was discontinued after Ambrazevičius/Brazaitis passed away in 1974.

References 

 1941 m. Lietuvos laikinosios vyriausybės atsiradimo aplinkybės, Doc. dr. Sigitas Jegelevičius, Voruta, No. 11 (557), June 11, 2004
 Lietuvių aktyvistų frontas, Laikinoji Vyriausybė ir žydų klausimas, Dr. Valentinas Brandišauskas, a presentation delivered during a seminar-discussion, March 23, 1999
Z.Ivinskis. The Lithuanian Revolt Against the Soviets in 1941

1941 disestablishments in Lithuania
Anti-communist organizations
Antisemitism in Lithuania
Far-right politics in Lithuania
People's Government of Lithuania
Lithuanian collaboration with Nazi Germany
Organizations established in 1940
Activist front
World War II resistance movements
Anti-Polish sentiment in Europe